Shah Kohli (born 12 July 1976) is an Indian judoka. She competed in the women's heavyweight event at the 1996 Summer Olympics.

References

External links
 

1976 births
Living people
Indian female judoka
Olympic judoka of India
Judoka at the 1996 Summer Olympics
Place of birth missing (living people)